Sportpark Oberwerth is a sports complex in Koblenz, Germany.  It consists of Stadion Oberwerth and Conlog Arena.

References

Football venues in Germany
Sports venues in Rhineland-Palatinate